The 1816 United States presidential election in South Carolina took place between November 1 to December 4, 1816, as part of the 1816 United States presidential election. The state legislature chose 11 representatives, or electors to the Electoral College, who voted for President and Vice President.

During this election, South Carolina cast its 11 electoral votes to Democratic Republican candidate and Secretary of State James Monroe.

References

South Carolina
1816
1816 South Carolina elections